The 2009 Viña del Mar International Song Festival was held from Monday 23 February until Saturday 28 February.
This festival was the number 50, and had a special award for the 50 years, the "Gold Song", elected between the winner songs from 2001 to 2008 versions of Festival. Finally, "Gold song" in the folk contest was "Cuecas Al Sol" (2005 winner), and in the international contest was "Ayer te vi" (2001 winner).

The television channels from the festival this year is "Canal 13" and "TVN", and was held in Viña del Mar, Chile

Hosts
 Soledad Onetto
 Felipe Camiroaga

Acts

Monday 23

Tuesday 24

Wednesday 25

Thursday 26

Friday 27

Saturday 28

Appearances
 Antonio Vodanovic did a special appearance at the opening of the festival to say goodbye to the audience, taking the "Silver Torch", after leaving the animation of the festival in 2004.
 Verónica Villarroel appeared at the opening of the second day as a surprise for the 50 years of the festival.
 On the third night, the Chilean businessman Leonardo Farkas did a surprise appearance, which lasted 15 minutes approximately.

Trivia
 The singer of KC and the Sunshine Band, Harry Wayne Casey, suffered a drop in the presentation of the band.
 The Italian-Swiss singer Paolo Meneguzzi suffered failures of sound at the start of his presentation after to the annoyance of the public by the end of the presentation of Simply Red.

Gold Song

International

 Winner: Argentina — Victor Heredia — "Ayer te ví"
 Awards: "Golden Lyre"

Folk

 Winner: Chile — Camila Méndez & Isabel Parra — "Cuecas Al Sol"
 Awards: "Golden Lyre" (Contest Folk), "Silver Seagull" (Best Interpreted)

Jury

International
 Juanita Parra
 Paolo Meneguzzi
 Catherine Fulop
 Martín Cárcamo
 Fernando Ubiergo
 Bastián Bodenhöfer
 Leonardo Farkas

Folk
 Rafael Zamarripa
 Katherine Salosny
 Fernanda Hansen
 Piero
 Sergio Campos

Queen of the Festival

 Winner: Catherine Fulop

Ugly King

 Winner: Leo Rey

International Coverage

 A&E Latin America
 CMI Televisión
 ATB Red Nacional 
 Telesistema Dominicano
 Televicentro Nicaragua
 Televisa
 Televicentro Honduras
 Canal 2
 Telefé
 Canal 11 SERTV
 Tlñ
 Repretel
 Canal 13 Guatemala
 TV Cerro Corá

References

Viña del Mar International Song Festival by year
V
2009 festivals in Chile
2009 music festivals

es:LI Festival Internacional de la Canción de Viña del Mar